Sir'Dominic Denzel Pointer  (born May 6, 1992) is an American professional basketball player for APOEL of the Cyprus Basketball Division A. He played college basketball at St. John's. He was drafted 53rd overall in the 2015 NBA draft by the Cleveland Cavaliers.

Early life 
Pointer was born on May 6, 1992 in Detroit, Michigan to Anthony Nolan and San Pointer. He has two sisters, Connae and twin Miz'Unique. According to him, his desire to outwork others came from his cousin Michael Robinson, who was shot and killed at age 26. Robinson helped him stay in school, motivated Pointer in basketball, and helped him avoid influence from gangs. Pointer later used his cousin's picture as his profile picture on Twitter and said, "I appreciate him for that."

High school career 
Pointer moved to Roseville, Michigan prior to playing his first two years of high school basketball at Roseville High School. He attended Quality Education Academy in Winston-Salem, North Carolina in his final two seasons. Following graduation, some recruiting services rated him as 8th best small forward and 24th best player of his class.

College career

As a senior at St. John's, Pointer received the Haggerty Award honoring the best college basketball player in New York City metropolitan region. He was named to the All Big East Second Team after averaging 13.7 points, 7.6 rebounds, 3.1 assists and 2.0 steals per game.

Professional career

Canton Charge (2015–2016)
On June 25, 2015, Pointer was drafted with the 53rd pick of the 2015 NBA draft by the Cleveland Cavaliers. On October 30, he was acquired by the Canton Charge of the NBA Development League, the affiliate team of Cleveland. On November 14, he made his professional debut in a 106–99 loss to the Maine Red Claws, recording 11 points, 8 rebounds, 4 assists and 1 steal in 29 minutes. Pointer averaged 6.9 points, 4.5 rebounds, 1.0 assist, 1.0 steal and 1.4 blocks in 20.3 minutes per game with Canton.

Israel (2016–2017)
In June, 2016, Pointer joined the Cavaliers for the 2016 NBA Summer League. On August 28, 2016, he signed with Hapoel Eilat of the Israeli League. He left Hapoel after appearing in only two games. He then joined the Ironi Kiryat Ata of the Liga Leumit.

Byblos (2017)
In July 2017, Pointer re-joined the Cleveland Cavaliers for the 2017 NBA Summer League. On October 16, 2017, he signed with Byblos Club of the Lebanese Basketball League. He left Byblos after appearing in nine games.

Alba Fehérvár (2018)
On January 13, 2018, Pointer signed with Hungarian club Alba Fehérvár.

Second stint with the Canton / Cleveland Charge (2018–2021)
Pointer was included in the training camp roster announced on October 20, 2018 and the opening night roster announced on November 1, 2018 by the Canton Charge.

It was reported that the Cleveland Cavaliers signed and waived Pointer in early October, 2019. Pointer was later included in the training camp roster announced on October 26, 2019 and the opening night roster announced on November 7, 2019 by the Canton Charge.

On March 4, 2020, Pointer signed a 10-day contract with the Cleveland Cavaliers. However, the season was suspended due to the COVID-19 pandemic and Pointer's deal expired before he appeared in a game for the team. He rejoined the Charge for the 2020–21 season.

APOEL (2021–present)
On July 27, 2021, Pointer signed with APOEL of the Cyprus Basketball Division A.

References

External links

St. John's Red Storm bio

1992 births
Living people
African-American basketball players
American expatriate basketball people in Israel
American expatriate basketball people in Lebanon
American men's basketball players
Basketball players from Michigan
Canton Charge players
Cleveland Cavaliers draft picks
Hapoel Eilat basketball players
Ironi Kiryat Ata players
People from Roseville, Michigan
Shooting guards
Small forwards
Sportspeople from Metro Detroit
St. John's Red Storm men's basketball players
United States men's national basketball team players
21st-century African-American sportspeople